Collingwood is an English surname. Notable people with the surname include:

Charles Collingwood (1943–) Canadian-born British actor
Charles Collingwood (1917–1985) American journalist and war correspondent
Cuthbert Collingwood (died 1597), English landowner
Cuthbert Collingwood, 1st Baron Collingwood (1748–1810), admiral of the Royal Navy
Cuthbert Collingwood (1826–1908) an English naturalist, surgeon and physician.
Edward Collingwood (1900–1970), British mathematician
Gabby Collingwood (born 1999), Australian rules footballer
Harry Collingwood (1843-1922), pseudonym of William Joseph Cosens Lancaster, English engineer and writer of boy's adventure fiction 
Lawrance Collingwood (1887–1982), English conductor, composer and record producer
Luke Collingwood, slave trader
Lyn Collingwood (born 1936), Australian actress
Monica Collingwood (January 5, 1908 – October 31, 1989), American film editor
Paul Collingwood (1976–) English cricketer
Robin George Collingwood, (1889–1943) philosopher and historian at Oxford University
William Gershom Collingwood, (1854–1932) author, artist and antiquarian

English-language surnames